Ramón Álvarez Barragán (born 9 August 1986) is a Mexican professional boxer.

Professional career
On Saturday June 28, 2008, Ramon who has seven brothers, made world history when all of them fought on the same card. The only downside being that three of them failed to win their pro debuts. The four more experienced brothers won.

Personal life
His brothers are welterweight prospects Ricardo Álvarez, former unified Light Middleweight and Middleweight Champion Canelo Álvarez and the former WBA World Light Middleweight Champion Rigoberto Álvarez.

Professional boxing record

See also
Notable boxing families

References

External links

1986 births
Living people
Mexican male boxers
Boxers from Jalisco
Sportspeople from Guadalajara, Jalisco
Welterweight boxers
Light-middleweight boxers